USS Choctaw (AT-70) was a  constructed for the United States Navy during World War II. Her purpose was to aid ships, usually by towing, on the high seas or in combat or post-combat areas, plus "other duties as assigned." She served in Bermuda during the end of World War II where she was primarily responsible to aiding in the assembly of convoys and ships taking part in training. On 15 May 1944, she was redesignated ATF-70. She continued to serve for 3 more years before being decommissioned on 11 March 1947.

Description

Choctaw was laid down 4 April 1942 by Charleston Shipbuilding and Drydock Co., Charleston, South Carolina and launched on 18 October 1942. She was commissioned 21 April 1943.

United States Navy

From 17 June 1943 to 8 May 1944, Choctaw served at Bermuda, where she aided assembling convoys and new ships undergoing training with tug and target-towing services. Putting to sea 8 May, she was reclassified ATF-70, 15 May, and reached Oran 19 May to take USS Holder (DE-401) in tow for New York City, where she delivered her tow 9 June. She returned to her duties at Bermuda until 22 July, when she sailed for ports in Wales to take two LSTs in tow for New York, arriving 30 September.

She took the collision-damaged ship in tow for Bermuda and Charleston, and returned to Newfoundland for service between 3 January 1945 and 14 March. She then operated off the east coast and in the Caribbean on salvage duty and in towing targets until 15 October 1946. Afterwards, she sailed to Orange, Texas to be placed out of commission, and in reserve, on 11 March 1947. She would remain there for three decades.

Transfer to Colombian Navy
After being laid up in the Atlantic Reserve Fleet for 30 years, she was struck from the Naval Register on 31 October 1977, and transferred to the Colombian Navy under the Security Assistance Program on 1 March 1978 as ARC Pedro De Heredia (RM-72).

References

External links 
 

 

Cherokee-class fleet tugs
World War II auxiliary ships of the United States
Ships built in Charleston, South Carolina
1942 ships
Cherokee-class fleet tugs of the Colombian Navy